Jakub Szela (was born 14 July 1787, Smarżowa, in Galicia - died 21 April 1860, Dealul Ederii, in Bukovina, now Romania) was a Polish leader of a peasant uprising against the Polish gentry in Galicia in 1846; directed against manorial property and oppression (for example, the manorial prisons) and rising against serfdom; scores of manors were attacked and their inhabitants murdered. Galician, mainly Polish, peasants killed ca. 1000 noblemen and destroyed ca. 500 manors in 1846.

He represented his village in an extended conflict with its unjust lord and was arrested and lashed several times. During the 1846 rebellion, instigated by Vienna, Szela became the leader of the Galician peasants, destroyed a number of manors, and killed, among others, the family of his lord, though he is reported to have saved the children. Szela tried to organize an all-Galician peasant uprising, with the main slogan of corvee refusal. The rebellious villages were pacified by the Austrian Army. After pacification of the rebellious villages by the Austrian Army, Szela was briefly arrested, and then resettled to Bukovina, where he was given a land grant by the Austrian government. He is also said to have received a medal from the Austrian government, an event reported as fact by Magosci et al. but played down as only a "Polish rumor" by Wolff.

Szela was portrayed sympathetically by Marie von Ebner-Eschenbach, a Czech-born Austrian writer who had serfs before 1848, in her short story “Jakob Szela” in Dorf- und Schlossgeschichten (1883). The massacre of the gentry in 1846 was the historical memory that haunted Stanisław Wyspiański's play The Wedding. He was also featured in a recent Monika Strzępka and Paweł Demirski’s play “In the Name of Jakub S.”.

References

Further reading
 Aleksander Gieysztor, History of Poland, 1968
 T. Simons Jr. The Peasant Revolt of 1846 in Galicia. [in] Recent Polish Historiography
 Tomasz Szubert, Kilka faktów z życia Jakuba Szeli [Several Facts from the Live of Jakub Szela], [in] Kwartalnik Historyczny 120, 2013, 3, 485-531; open access:https://www.academia.edu/40750414/Kilka_fakt%C3%B3w_z_%C5%BCycia_Jakuba_Szeli_Several_Facts_from_the_Live_of_Jakob_Szela_ 
 Tomasz Szubert, Jak(ó)b Szela (14) 15 lipca 1787 - 21 kwietnia 1860, Ed. Wydawnictwo DiG, Warszawa 2014   ISBN 978–83–7181–851–6 ; open access: https://www.academia.edu/44024456/Jak_%C3%B3_b_Szela_14_15_lipca_1787_21_kwietnia_1860_FRAGMENTY

1787 births
1860 deaths
People from Dębica County
Polish revolutionaries
People of the Revolutions of 1848
19th-century Polish farmers
Austrian farmers
Serfs
Polish rebels